Anna Maria Therés Book Toledano (born 10 September 1970) is a Swedish pop singer. She participated in Let's Dance in 2006 and finished in second place with dancer David Watson.

Melodifestivalen
She has participated in Melodifestivalen, the contest to select Sweden's entry for the Eurovision Song Contest, a total of 3 times. At the first Melodifestivalen 2007 semi-final on 3 February in Jönköping, Book's song "Samba Sambero" was the second song announced as a finalist. The song then went on and finished ninth and second last in the final, where it received one point. Her fourth participation would have been in 2016 with the song "Himmel för två" (Heaven for Two). However, her song was disqualified on 4 February 2016, two days before the semi-final because the song had already participated in the Moldovan national selection for the Eurovision Song Contest 2014.

Discography

Albums
{| class="wikitable plainrowheaders" style="text-align:center;"
|-
! scope="col" rowspan="2"| Title
! scope="col" rowspan="2"| Year
! scope="col" colspan="1"| Peak chart positions
|-
! scope="col" style="width:3em;font-size:85%;"| SWE
|-
! scope="row"| Killsnack – backing vocals by Lili & Susie| 1985
| —
|-
! scope="row"| Längtar| 1986
| —
|-
! scope="row"| Anna| 1995
| —
|-
! scope="row"| Let's Dance + 13 favoriter| rowspan="2"| 2006
| 7
|-
! scope="row"| ABC| —
|-
! scope="row"| Samba Sambero| 2007
| 38
|}

Singles
1986 "Killsnack"
1986 "ABC"
1996 "My Love for You"
2007 Samba Sambero''

References

External links
 Anna Book official website

1970 births
Living people
Swedish pop singers
Swedish television personalities
Swedish women television presenters
21st-century Swedish singers
21st-century Swedish women singers
Melodifestivalen contestants of 2007
Melodifestivalen contestants of 2006
Melodifestivalen contestants of 1987
Melodifestivalen contestants of 1986